Kelby is both a surname and a given name. Notable people with the name include:

Surname
 N. M. Kelby, American short-story and novel writer
Given name
Kelby Guilfoyle, writer
Kelby Tomlinson (born 1990), American baseball player
Kelby Woodard (born 1970), American politician

Unisex given names
English unisex given names